Servicio de Inteligencia de la Fuerza Aérea (Air Force Intelligence Service, SIFA) is the intelligence agency of the Argentine Air Force. It is part of J-2. Its director is Commodore García.

See also
Argentine Air Force
Army Intelligence Service
Naval Intelligence Service
National Intelligence System
National Directorate of Strategic Military Intelligence

Argentine intelligence agencies
Argentine Air Force